Sidia Sana Jatta (born 1945) is a Gambian politician, academic, and writer.

Early life and education

A Mandinka, Jatta was born in Sutukoba, Wuli District. He was educated locally and at Nungua Secondary School, near Accra, Ghana from 1961 to 1963, before returning to The Gambia to attend Yundum College from 1964 to 1966. After working as a school teacher in various primary and secondary schools until 1972, he enrolled at the University of Grenoble  from 1973 to 1978, obtaining undergraduate and master's degrees in linguistics. He returned to France again to further his study in 1983.

Career

He resigned from the government in 1986 in protest to the performance of the ruling People's Progressive Party government.

Jatta founded the People's Democratic Organisation for Independence and Socialism in 1986, an opposition party to ruling president Sir Dawda Jawara and was elected its first chairperson in 1987. He is the coeditor of the party's newspaper, Foroyaa. He stood in Wulli Constituency for the PDOIS in the 1987 House of Representatives election stood again in 1992 but finished last in both elections. 
Along with Halifa Sallah, he refused the offer of a post in the Armed Forces Provisional Ruling Council government in 1994. He was briefly detained in August 1994 in defiance of the government ban on political activities.

In 1997, Wulli Constituency was divided into two constituencies (Wulli East and Wulli West) and he won Wulli West Constituency in the 1997 national assembly election. Subsequently, he became one of the most trenchant critics in the APRC government in the country's national assembly.

He is also a member of the national assembly from Wuli West. Jatta is also the Secretary General of Wulli Adult Literacy Development Association.

References

 Gambia: Provide Fertilizer and Efficient Marketing for Farmers - Sidia Jatta allafrica.com 20 March 2007
 Sidia Jatta African People Database (page is cached)

1945 births
Living people
Members of the National Assembly of the Gambia
People's Democratic Organisation for Independence and Socialism politicians
Gambian academics
Gambian socialists
Grenoble Alpes University alumni